FCS Nacional is a Surinamese football club. They were relegated from the Surinamese Eerste Klasse, the second tier of football in Suriname, in 2012. They played their home games in Houttuin, Wanica District at the Nacionello Stadion. In 2013 the club merged with S.V. Deva Boys to form Nacional Deva Boys.

History
 2000: the club is renamed FCS Nacional from SV Boxel
 2010: the club is relegated for the first time under the name FCS Nacional, after withdrawing from the league
 2013: the club merges with Deva Boys under the name Nacional Deva Boys

Notable former coaches
  Andy Atmodimedjo (2007–2008)

Achievements
 Hoofdklasse:
 2003

 Beker van Suriname:
 2005

 Suriname President's Cup:
 2005

References

Nacional
1960 establishments in Suriname